Aghuz Koti (also Romanized as Āghūz Kotī and Āghūzkatī; also known as Āghūzkī-ye Bālā) is a village in Jennat Rudbar Rural District, in the Central District of Ramsar County, Mazandaran Province, Iran. At the 2006 census, its population was 21, in 8 families.

References 

Populated places in Ramsar County